Kirk is an unincorporated town, a post office, and a census-designated place (CDP) located in and governed by Yuma County, Colorado, United States. The Kirk post office has the ZIP Code 80824. At the United States Census 2010, the population of the Kirk CDP was 59, while the population of the 80824 ZIP Code Tabulation Area was 207 including adjacent areas.

Etymology
"Kirk" is the Scots language word for "church".

Description
Kirk is home to a grain elevator, meat processing plant, bank, grocery, feed and supply store and the post office.

History
The Kirk post office has been in operation since 1887, with an original name of Kim. The community was established by A. Newkirk, and named for him.

Geography

Demographics

See also

Outline of Colorado
Index of Colorado-related articles
State of Colorado
Colorado cities and towns
Colorado census designated places
Colorado counties
Yuma County, Colorado

References

External links

Yuma County website

Census-designated places in Yuma County, Colorado
Census-designated places in Colorado